Pontonoa gounellei is a species of beetle in the family Carabidae, the only species in the genus Pontonoa.

References

Lebiinae